Anup Revanna is an Indian actor who works in Kannada cinema. The son of former Karnataka minister H M Revanna, Anup entered the film industry as an actor through the 2016 action film Lakshmana.

Early life
Anup Revanna was born on 8 February 1994 in Bangalore as the son of Politician H.M. Revanna and Vatsala Revanna. He attended Dayananda Sagar College of Engineering, Bangalore.

Career 
Anup learned acting in Koothu-P-Pattarai. In 2016 Anup debuted as a lead actor in R. Chandru's action film Lakshmana. His second film was Na Panta Kano, directed by S. Narayan, and was released in 2017.

Filmography
All films are in Kannada, Otherwise noted the language.

References

External links
 

Living people
1994 births
Indian male film actors
Male actors in Kannada cinema
21st-century Indian male actors
Male actors from Bangalore